Jorge Nuré (24 September 1926 – 31 August 2011) was an Argentine basketball player who competed in the 1948 Summer Olympics when they finished 15th.

References

1926 births
2011 deaths
Argentine men's basketball players
Olympic basketball players of Argentina
Basketball players at the 1948 Summer Olympics
Pan American Games silver medalists for Argentina
Basketball players at the 1951 Pan American Games
Pan American Games medalists in basketball
Medalists at the 1951 Pan American Games